Roland Smith is an American author. 

Roland Smith may also refer to:

 J. Roland Smith (born 1933), American politician
 R. R. R. Smith (Roland Ralph Redfern Smith, born 1954), British classicist, archaeologist, and academic
 Rolland Smith (born 1941), American television anchor
 David Smith (sculptor) (Roland David Smith, 1906–1965), American abstract expressionist sculptor and painter

See also
Rowland Smith, British politician